Bodenstab is a surname. Notable people with the surname include:

Henry Bodenstab (1874–1948), American politician, son of Julius
Julius Bodenstab (1834–1916), American politician